Józef Kazimierz Lubański (1914 – 8 December 1946) was a Polish theoretical  physicist.

Life and works 
Lubanski obtained the degree of magister philosophies at Wilna in 1937. He then worked for two years as an assistant in theoretical physics at Polish universities, and obtained a grant in order to travel to Holland and to work under Prof. H. A. Kramers at Leyden. His original intention was to go to Copenhagen in the following year, although the Second World War prevented this.

Lubanski worked with Léon Rosenfeld at Utrecht, and dating from this period he wrote a number of papers on the properties of mesons mainly in the journal Physica, one in the Arkiv för matematik, astronomi och fysik.

Around 1937 in Kraków, he collaborated with Myron Mathisson and Weyssenhoff's colleagues on the motion of spinning particles in linearized gravitational fields according to general relativity, and under Mathisson's lead, published a paper on the derivation of the Mathisson–Papapetrou–Dixon equations.

He developed the Pauli–Lubanski pseudovector in relativistic quantum mechanics.

He also worked at the laboratory of Delft University of Technology in aerodynamics and hydrodynamics.

See also
Relativistic wave equations

References

Quantum physicists
20th-century Polish physicists
1914 births
1947 deaths